Internews Network, now Internews, is a 501(c)(3) organization incorporated in California, formed in 1982. It was founded by David M. Hoffman, Kim Spencer, and Evelyn Messinger. The president and CEO is Jeanne Bourgault.

Internews Europe is an independent media development organization, based in London, United Kingdom and relying mainly on European funding. Internews Europe is chaired by Mark Stephens. One of the organization's first projects was a series of Spacebridges that connected the U.S. and Soviet Union by satellite, a program that culminated with a TV series named "Capital to Capital" that aired on ABC and won an Emmy Award in 1988.

In early 2015, Internews Network and Internews Europe began to integrate more closely and operate cooperatively with independent boards of directors.

Overview

Internews Network is primarily supported by grants, with over 80 percent of their funding coming from the US government. According to the Internews 2011 990 filings, 100% of its funding comes from public sources, making them completely dependent upon government funding, meaning that none of the private funding sources cited below any longer support Internews. Funders have included the AOL-Time Warner Foundation, the Beagle Foundation, the Carnegie Corporation of New York, and others.  The US Agency for International Development and the US Department of State provide the overwhelming (99.98%) of funding for Internews operations per Internews 2009 990 filings.

Criminal investigations

In April 2007 Russian police raided the office of the Educated Media Foundation, a section of Internews which trains journalists and fosters an independent media, as part of an investigation into  its president, Manana Aslamazyan, who was accused of bringing too much cash into Russia from a visit to France. Russia's Constitutional Court ruled on May 26, 2008, that charges against Manana Aslamazyan were illegal. In line with the ruling, Russia’s Interior Ministry dropped the charges and a warrant for Aslamazyan’s arrest.

Internews Center for Innovation & Learning

Based in Washington, D.C., and operating globally, The Internews Center for Innovation & Learning experiments with various approaches to communication from around the world. The center intends to capturing the technological discoveries of field offices to enrich the knowledge base of the international development community as a whole.

Internews' current Media Map project is the main feature of the center. In partnership with the World Bank Institute and the Brookings Institution and supported by the Bill & Melinda Gates Foundation, the Media Map project analyzes and publishes data on the interrelations between information access and outcomes in democracy and governance, economic growth, poverty reduction, human rights, gender equality, and health.

Leadership 

The president and CEO is Jeanne Bourgault. The Board of Directors includes senior leaders from media, business and government, such as 
Chris Boskin, Simone Otus Coxe, founder David Hoffman, Lorne Craner, Anja Manuel, and Cristiana Falcone Sorrell.  National Security Advisor Susan Rice served on Internews' Board before rejoining the U.S. government.

References

External links
Internews Network

International journalism organizations
1982 establishments in California
International organisations based in the United Kingdom